Stuart Soane (born 5 November 1987 in Dunfermline) is a Scottish footballer who plays for Forres Mechanics in the Highland Football League.

He began his career after signing a full-time contract with Inverness Caledonian Thistle in the summer of 2005, having come through the club's youth system. He made his debut in a 2–0 defeat of Falkirk on 3 May 2006. He left the club in the summer of 2007.

Later that summer he signed for Peterhead on a part-time contract. Soane then signed a contract to play for Highland League side Huntly in July 2008.

External links

1987 births
Living people
Scottish footballers
Inverness Caledonian Thistle F.C. players
Peterhead F.C. players
Scottish Premier League players
Scottish Football League players
Huntly F.C. players
Formartine United F.C. players
Forres Mechanics F.C. players
Footballers from Dunfermline
Association football midfielders
Highland Football League players